Kuala Lumpur Kepong Berhad (KLK) is a Malaysian multi-national company. The core business of the group is plantation (oil palm and rubber). The company has plantations that cover more than 250,000 hectares in Malaysia (both Peninsular and Sabah) and Indonesia (Belitung, Sumatra and Kalimantan). Since the 1990s, the company has diversified its business activities such as resource-based manufacturing (oleochemicals, derivatives and speciality chemicals), property development and retailing (personal care products, toiletries and fine foods) with worldwide presence. The company is listed on the Bursa Malaysia and is Malaysia's third-largest palm oil producer. KLK was ranked 1858th in the 2013 Forbes Global 2000 Leading Companies, with market cap of USD 6.91 billion. In 2014, KLK was ranked 23rd most valuable Malaysia brand on the Malaysia 100 2014 with a brand value of USD 364 million.
The late Thong Yaw Hong, (former) secretary general of the Malaysian Treasury, sat on the board of KLK.
 Lee Oi Hian, the CEO of KLK, is or was chairman of the board of trustees of the Malaysian Palm Oil Council.

History

The Kuala Lumpur Rubber Company, Limited (KLR) (1906–1960)
KLR was founded in London, in 1906 to oversee some 600 ha. plantations (rubber and coffee) in Malaya (now Malaysia). In 1907, the shares of KLR were listed on the London Stock Exchange.

Kuala Lumpur-Kepong Amalgamated Limited (KLKA) (1960–1973)
In 1960, KLR changed its name to KLKA. The group started to plant oil palm in Fraser Estate. The group's first mill, the Fraser Mill was opened in 1967. In 1971, KLKA opened its Head Office in Kuala Lumpur. The next year, KLKA's tax residence was transferred from the United Kingdom to Malaysia.

Kuala Lumpur Kepong Berhad (KLK) (1973–present) 
In 1973, Kuala Lumpur Kepong Berhad (KLK) was incorporated in Malaysia and under a Scheme of Reconstruction, KLKA went into voluntary liquidation with KLK taking over the assets and liabilities of KLKA. The company's shares is listed on the stock exchanges of Kuala Lumpur, Singapore and London. In 1979, the Head Office was moved from Kuala Lumpur to Ladang Pinji, Perak.

Business activities

Plantation
Plantation is the core business of KLK. Currently, KLK has more than 250,000 ha. of plantations areas in Malaysia and Indonesia. The annual production for fresh fruit bunches (FFB) is 3.1 million tonnes. KLK's own mills and refineries will then process the crop into crude palm oil, RBD palm olein and stearin, and kernel oil and cake. Meanwhile, in 2010, the production of rubber was approximately 23 million kg. It is among the few companies, that have been prosecuted for open burning so far.
As of September 2010, the geographical distribution of the group's plantations is as follows:

Resource-based manufacturing

Oleochemicals

The core division of the sector is KLK Oleo, one of the largest palm oil based oleochemicals producer in the world. KLK marked it entrance into oleochemicals back in 1991, with the opening of Palm-Oleo Sdn. Bhd. Currently, KLK Oleo consists of nine companies, six in Malaysia, two in China and one in Europe (situated in Emmerich am Rhein, Germany). The full list of the companies is shown below.

Others
KLK also owns Dr. W. Kolb Holding AG, a producer of nonionic surfactant with their headquarters in Switzerland and Stolthaven (Westport) Sdn. Bhd., a common user liquid storage terminal at Westport, Port Klang.

The production factories of Dr.W.Kolb AG are located below:

 Dr.W.Kolb Moerdijk (The Netherlands)
 Dr.W.Kolb Specialties Delden (The Netherlands)

Property
KLK owns KL-Kepong Country Homes Sdn. Bhd. Notable residential areas developed by KLK are Desa Coalfields and Seri Coalfields, both in Sungai Buloh, Selangor.

Retailing 
 Crabtree & Evelyn is a retailer of personal care products, toiletries, home fragrance products and fine foods with the headquarters in Woodstock, Connecticut, USA. The brand is sold in 40 countries. In early 2012, the Crabtree & Evelyn business was sold to Khuan Choo International Limited for US$155 million.

References

1906 establishments in British Malaya
Palm oil companies of Malaysia
Companies listed on Bursa Malaysia
Conglomerate companies of Malaysia
Multinational companies headquartered in Malaysia
Agriculture companies established in 1906